Francis Bland (1882–1967) was an Australian politician.

Francis Bland may also refer to:

Sir Francis Bland, 2nd Baronet (1642–1663), of the Bland baronets
 Sir Francis Christopher Bland (1938–2017), British businessman and politician

See also
Francis Bland Tucker (1895–1984),  American Bible scholar, priest and hymn writer
Bland (surname)